Cleavant Derricks may refer to:

 Cleavant Derricks (songwriter), prolific songwriter known for many gospel music standards
 Cleavant Derricks (actor), stage and screen actor and musician, in Sliders and Dreamgirls, son of the above